Hunter Austin Bradley (born May 21, 1994) is an American football long snapper who is a free agent. He played college football at Mississippi State. He was selected by the Green Bay Packers in the seventh round of the 2018 NFL Draft.

College career
Bradley began his MSU career in 2012 as a tight end but multiple knee surgeries forced him into a long snapping role, which he took over as a starter in 2015. The 6-foot-3, 240-pounder from Collierville, Tennessee was perfect through 41 career games and also collected four tackles.

Professional career

Green Bay Packers
Bradley was selected by the Green Bay Packers with the 239th overall pick in the seventh round of the 2018 NFL Draft. This made Bradley only the ninth long snapper ever drafted in the NFL Draft. The Packers originally acquired the pick used to select Bradley by trading Lerentee McCray to the Buffalo Bills. On May 4, 2018, he signed a contract with the Packers.

Bradley was placed on the reserve/COVID-19 list by the Packers on August 3, 2020. He was activated on August 19, 2020.

He was released on November 2, 2021.

Arizona Cardinals
On December 28, 2022, Bradley signed with the practice squad of the Arizona Cardinals.

References

External links
Mississippi State Bulldogs bio

Living people
1994 births
American football long snappers
Arizona Cardinals players
Green Bay Packers players
Mississippi State Bulldogs football players
People from Collierville, Tennessee
Players of American football from Tennessee